The name Felicia derives from the Latin adjective felix, meaning "happy, lucky", though in the neuter plural form felicia it literally means "happy things" and often occurred in the phrase tempora felicia, "happy times". The sense of it as a feminine personal name appeared in post-Classical use and is of uncertain origin. It is associated with saints, poets, astronomical objects, plant genera, fictional characters, and animals, especially cats.

People
 Felicia Nimue Ackerman (born 1947), American Brown University Philosophy professor, monthly op-ed columnist, poet and author
 Felicia Adeyoyin (1938–2021), Nigerian academic
 Felicia Barton (born 1982), an American semifinalist on the eighth season of American Idol
 Felicia Bond (born 1954), American writer and illustrator, author of If You Give a Mouse a Cookie
 Felicia Brabec (born  1974), American politician and clinical psychologist
 Felicia Brandström (born 1987), Swedish singer and one of the contestants in Swedish Idol 2006
 Felicia Chin (born 1984), Singaporean actress
 Felicia Cornaro (died 1111), Venetian dogaressa and de facto politician
 Felicia Day (born 1979), American actress
 Felicia Donceanu (1931–2022), Romanian painter, sculptor, and composer
 Felicia Elizondo (1946–2021), American transgender activist
 Felicia Farr (born 1932), American actress, widow of Jack Lemmon
 Felicia Hano (born 1998), American artistic gymnast
 Felicia Browne Hemans (1793–1835), English poet
 Felicia Pearson (born 1980), American actress from The Wire

Fictional characters
 Felicia, a character in the webseries Corner Shop Show played by Lynsey Pennycooke
 Felicia, the clumsy maid in the video game Fire Emblem Fates
 Felicia, a catgirl in the Capcom video game series Darkstalkers
 Felicia, 1995 titular of cancelled RPG SNES by Tonkin House
 Felicia, an unlockable character in Myth Makers: Super Kart GP
 Felicia Forrester, a character in the American soap opera The Bold and the Beautiful
 Felicia Hardy, more commonly known by her alias, Black Cat, a Marvel Comics character
 Felicia Jones, a character in the American soap opera General Hospital
 Felicia, one of the titular character's children in the DreamWorks animated film Shrek Forever After
 Felicia Miller, a character in Valentine's Day played by Taylor Swift
 Felicia Tilman, a character in Desperate Housewives played by Harriet Sansom Harris

Feminine given names
Latin feminine given names
Given names
Romanian feminine given names